Democracy and Equality was an organized caucus in the French Socialist Party. 

The faction was founded in 2000 by Henri Emmanuelli and Alain Vidalies. At the Second Grenoble Congress, the faction obtained 13.78% of the vote. 

The short-lived movement joined the New World, formed by the merger of Democracy and Equality with the remnants of the Socialist Left in 2002.

Factions of the Socialist Party (France)
Political party factions in France